USS PC-1640 was an  in the United States Navy during the Cold War. She was transferred to the Turkish Navy as TCG Yarhisar (P 113) of the Hisar-class patrol boat.

Construction and commissioning 
PC-1640 was laid down on 11 March 1963 at Gunderson Brothers Engineering Corps., Portland, Oregon. Launched on 14 May 1964 and commissioned on 27 August 1964.

On 18 July 1965, she was transferred to the Turkish Navy in San Diego and renamed TCG Yarhisar (P 113).

She was decommissioned in 2005.

In 2006, beginning to serve as a museum ship, Turkey's first and only land placed warship museum title. The museum ship is open to visitors today on the coast of Gölcük district of Kocaeli.

Gallery

Further reading 

 Navsource.org

References

PC-1638-class submarine chasers
1964 ships
Ships transferred from the United States Navy to the Turkish Navy
Ships built in Portland, Oregon
Museum ships in Turkey